The AF Group ASA is the third largest civil engineering and construction company in Norway. The company headquarters is located in Oslo. The AF Group is listed on the Oslo Stock Exchange.

History 
The AF Group was established in 1985. The company eventually went into the oil and gas sector and built the landfall tunnel from the Troll Field in 1991, among other projects. AF merged with Ragnar Evensen in 1997, one of Oslo's largest contractors, which doubled AF's revenues. The acquisition of real estate-company Odin in 1997 was the basis for the business area Property, and AF built up the business areas demolition and recycling in the years that followed. The company took on the demolition of Sola Refinery in Jæren in 2000, one of the largest demolition projects in Norway. AF eventually became one of Norway's biggest within demolition.

Today, the company is one of the largest providers of energy efficiency and renewable energy production. In 2013, Offshore was established as a separate business area, after several projects in the years before. The Offshore commitment was extended with maintenance and modification, as well as marine and rig services, and new contracts in the North Sea resulted in Environmental Base at Vats, a modern reception facility for decommissioned offshore installations.

Former subsidiaries

Norway
 AF Gruppen Industri AS
 AF Ragnar Evensen AS
 AF Spesialistprosjekt AS
 AF Brødrene Holstad
 Rolvsrud Utbygging AS
 SRG - Scandinavian Rock Group AS

Sweden
 AF Anläggning AB
 JK Bygg i Göteborg AB

Business areas

Property
The real estate division is responsible for developing the housing business and manages a number of properties in Eastern Norway and Western Sweden.

Building
The building division of AF supplies new constructions, including residential buildings, office buildings, schools and cultural and institutional buildings.

Civil Engineering
Civil engineering is the largest division in the AF Group. It is divided into three business units: AF Civil Engineering,  AF Harbour, AF Oil & Energy and has projects all over Norway, and western Sweden.

Environment
The environment division works with demolition and upgrading of older structures, including offshore installations for which it has built a top-modern decommissioning yard at Vats, near Haugesund. The division has offices in Norway, the United Kingdom and Poland.

Energy
The energy division works with designing, improving and optimizing energy solutions in buildings, constructions and ships and offshore installations. It has offices in Norway and China.

Management 
 Morten Grongstad - CEO/ President
 Sverre Hærem - CFO/ Executive Vice President
 Arild Moe - Executive Vice President Civil Engineering
 Henning Olsen - Executive Vice President Building
 Amund Tøftum - Executive Vice President Offshore
 Andreas Jul Røsjø - Executive Vice President Property and Energy
 Eirik Wraal - Executive Vice President Environment
 Bård Frydenlund - Executive Vice President Human Resources

Honors and rewards
 AF's website was named winner of the Farmandpris in 2009 in the category for best website among listed Norwegian companies.
 The AF Group won the Farmandpris in 2015 for  best annual report in the category of listed companies.
 AF and Peer Gynt AS won the Culture and Business award in 2009 in the category culture based business. Forum for Culture and Business, in cooperation with Innovation Norway, hands out awards to honor and encourage cultural and business cooperation. 
 The AF Group won Construction of the year in 2007 with the project Blåfalli Vik.

References

Construction and civil engineering companies of Norway
Real estate companies of Norway
Companies based in Oslo
Real estate companies established in 1985
Companies listed on the Oslo Stock Exchange
Norwegian companies established in 1985
Construction and civil engineering companies established in 1985